Popowo  is a village in the administrative district of Gmina Wałcz, Wałcz County, West Pomeranian Voivodeship, Poland.

The village has a population of 130.

References

Villages in Wałcz County